Jan Aronsson (28 November 1931 – 4 January 2016) was a Swedish footballer who played as a forward. He made two appearances for Sweden, 220 Allsvenskan appearances for Degerfors IF and nine Allsvenskan appearances for Djurgårdens IF.

References

1931 births
2016 deaths
Association football forwards
Swedish footballers
Sweden international footballers
Allsvenskan players
Degerfors IF players
L.R. Vicenza players
Djurgårdens IF Fotboll players
People from Karlskoga Municipality
Sportspeople from Örebro County
20th-century Swedish people